The Ansarullah Bangla Team (ABT), also called Ansar Bangla is a terrorist organization in Bangladesh, implicated in crimes including some brutal attacks and murders of atheist bloggers from 2013 to 2015 and a bank heist in April 2015. The gang was outlawed days after the bank robbery by the Ministry of Home Affairs on 25 May 2015. The group has been claimed by police to be linked to Islami Chhatra Shibir, the student wing of Jamaat-e-Islami party in Bangladesh.

Confessions of five members of the group were recorded by Dhaka Metropolitan Magistrate Harun-or-Rashid that continued from 1 pm to 8 pm relating to the murder of Ahmed Rajib Haider on February 15, 2013. Another four have been arrested for the attack on blogger Asif Mohiuddin. They also claimed responsibility for the murder of three atheist bloggers, Avijit Roy, Oyasiqur Rahman Babu, and Ananta Bijoy Das, and murder of Rajshahi University sociology professor AKM Shafiul Islam.

According to the Terrorism Research & Analysis Consortium, the ABT is an al Qaeda inspired Islamic extremist group in Bangladesh that started its activities during 2007 as the Jama’atul Muslemin funded by different NGOs. The group ceased to operate when funding ended. It resurfaced during 2013 as the ABT. Ansarullah Bangla Team is a front group for al-Qaeda in the Indian Subcontinent.

History
A new report in 2013 identified Muhammad Jasimuddin Rahmani as the spiritual leader of a militant group in Bangladesh. He was inspired by Anwar al-Awlaki, who had been killed by the US. He was suspected of building an Islamist terror network in Bangladesh for about minimum 5 years. They shared their views on a website called “Ansarulla Bangla Team”. The server of the website was located in Pakistan. Muhammad Jasimuddin Rahmani was the Imam of Hatembagh mosque, Dhanmondi. The organization has a presence on Facebook where it publishes propaganda and names its targets. Many of its supporters online are also supporters of Bangladesh Islami Chhatra Shibir and Bangladesh Jamaat-e-Islami.

Militant activity

Murders
The ABT claimed responsibility for some of the prominent murders and attacks of atheist bloggers, including Ahmed Rajib Haider, Asif Mohiuddin, Avijit Roy, Oyasiqur Rahman, Ananta Bijoy Das and AKM Shafiul Islam.

On 21 November, two of the men sentenced to death for the murder of Avijit Roy escaped from a courtroom in Dhaka, assisted by men on motorbikes armed with chemical sprays.

Ashulia bank robbery
The ABT was implicated in a bank robbery of a branch of the Bangladesh Commerce Bank Limited in Ashulia of Savar on April 21, 2015. The robbery started at 3 pm, when 8-10 people entered the bank brandishing guns. According to witness reports, they tried to take  5  (US$6,400 as of June 2015) while holding bank officials hostage at gunpoint. However, as some of the officials obstructed the robbers, they were stabbed, injuring 5 of which 3 succumbed to their injuries in medical care:
 a bank manager,
 a security officer and
 a bank customer.

However, at that point, locals outside quickly used a nearby mosque with loudspeakers to announce the bank robbery. The robbers heard the announcements and started violently fleeing the area, using several rounds of shots, hurling molotov cocktails and grenades. This sudden outburst injured some 20 people; 3 of whom died immediately after hospital admission, 2 later while receiving treatment at around 8:30 pm and one more person on the next night.

The robbers divided and fled the scene, some on foot and some on motorcycles. A mob quickly formed and caught 2 robbers on one bike and another robber in another area. In a mass beating of the two caught, the mob killed one and hospitalised the other – who later succumbed to his injuries. The police attempted to recover the robbers but this led to a clash and two police vehicles being vandalised. Arrival of police backup put the situation under control and the robbers captured.

A total of 9 people were either killed immediately or succumbed to injuries sustained, and at least 14 others were at most injured by bullet-wounds from weapons used by the robbers. Interrogation of the captured robber(s) led to the arrest of more suspects; police found that several of the robbers were members of the ABT.

Arrests
The following arrests were made of speculated or confirmed ABT members as of 1 June 2015.
 Asif Mohiuddin's attempted murder (13 January 2013 attack) – 1 April 2013 arrests.
 Saad-al-Nahin – 24, student.
 Kawsar Ahmed – 23, hawker.
 Kamal Uddin – 23, carpenter.
 Kamal Hossain – 28, bank security guard.
 Ahmed Rajib Haider's murder (15 February 2013 attack) – 2 March 2013 arrests of five North South University students.
 Faisal bin Nayeem (alias Dwip)
 Maksudul Hassan Anik
 Ehsan Reza Rumman
 Naim Sikder Irad
 Nafis Imtiaz
 ABT arrests – 12 August 2013.
Mufti Jasim Uddin Rahmani – Suspected chief of the ABT.
 30 others.
 Ashulia bank robbery – 21 April 2015.
 Al Amin Hossain (21 April 2015 arrest) – A robber caught by the locals.
 Mahfuzul Islam Shamim (30 April 2015 arrest) – The 'operation commander' of the Ashulia bank robbery, an ex-member of the banned Jama'atul Mujahideen Bangladesh and confessor of crimes including robbery and murder of a bKash vendor on 10 March 2015.
 Two others killed as a result of mass beating by a mob.

Sentences

In December 2015 several members of ABT were sentenced for the murder of activist Ahmed Rajib Haider, including:
 Faisal bin Nayem alias Dweep - sentenced to death
 Rezwanul Azad Rana - sentenced to death in absentia
 Jasim Uddin Rahmani - 5 years imprisonment, Taka 2,000 fine
 Maksudul Hasan - life imprisonment in absentia

Ban
The outfit was planned to be banned in 2013 alongside 9 others but the ban on the ABT was not enacted at the time. After a police request for a ban following an investigation report of the bank heist two years later, the Ministry of Home Affairs officially banned them on 25 May 2015.

References

Jihadist groups in Bangladesh